David Caesar Cloud (January 29, 1817 – July 10, 1903) was an American politician, writer, and lawyer.

Born in Champaign County, Ohio, Cloud moved to Muscatine, Iowa Territory in 1839. He was a carpenter and studied law. In 1846, Cloud was admitted to the Iowa bar. In 1851, Cloud was elected county attorney for Muscatine County, Iowa. From 1853 to 1856, Cloud served as the first Iowa Attorney General and was a Democrat. He then served in the Iowa House of Representatives from 1856 to 1858. He supported President Abraham Lincoln and the Republican Party. Cloud wrote several books on monopolies and the war powers of the president of the United States. In 1872, at the Democratic Party convention, Cloud supported Horace Greeley for the presidency. He continued to practice law. Then, Cloud moved to Chicago, Illinois because of his age and health. He died in Chicago.

Notes

1817 births
1903 deaths
Politicians from Chicago
People from Muscatine, Iowa
People from Champaign County, Ohio
American carpenters
Iowa lawyers
Iowa Democrats
Iowa Republicans
Writers from Iowa
Writers from Ohio
Iowa Attorneys General
Members of the Iowa House of Representatives
19th-century American politicians
District attorneys in Iowa